Thaba Chweu Local Municipality, is a municipality of South Africa, located in the Ehlanzeni District Municipality, Mpumalanga.

Main places
The 2001 census divided the municipality into the following main places:

Politics 

The municipal council consists of twenty-seven members elected by mixed-member proportional representation. Fourteen are elected by first-past-the-post voting in fourteen wards, while the remaining thirteen are chosen from party lists so that the total number of party representatives is proportional to the number of votes received. In the election of 1 November 2021 the African National Congress (ANC) won a majority of sixteen seats on the council.

The following table shows the results of the election.

By-elections from November 2021 
The following by-elections were held to fill vacant ward seats in the period since November 2021.

After the by-election, the council was reconfigured as below:

References

External links
Thaba Chweu Government site

2000 establishments in South Africa
Local municipalities of the Ehlanzeni District Municipality